Martino Soracreppa (born 9 May 1968) is an Italian ice hockey player. He competed in the men's tournament at the 1992 Winter Olympics.

References

External links
 

1968 births
Living people
Olympic ice hockey players of Italy
Ice hockey players at the 1992 Winter Olympics
Ice hockey people from Bolzano